Mikey is a masculine given name, often a diminutive form (hypocorism) of Michael. It may also refer to:

People
 Mikey Ambrose (born 1993), American Major League Soccer player
 Mikey Anderson (born 1999), American ice hockey player
 Mikey Arroyo (born 1969), Filipino actor and politician, son of Philippine President Gloria Macapagal-Arroyo
 Mikey Boyle, Irish hurler
 Mikey Chung (born 1954), Jamaican musician, arranger and record producer
 Mikey Coppola (born 1946), American mobster also known as "Mikey Cigars"
 Mikey Craig (born 1960), English musician, bassist of the 1980s band Culture Club
 Mikey Day (born 1980), American actor, comedian, writer, cast member of Saturday Night Live
 Mikey Mileos (born 1980), Australian stand-up comedian
 Mikey Garcia (born 1987), American boxer, world champion in three weight classes
 Michael Graham (singer) (born 1972), Irish singer, songwriter and record producer
 Mikey Lee (born 1993), Irish hurler
 Mikey Lopez (born 1993), American Major League Soccer player
 Mikey Maher (1870–1947), Irish hurler
 Mikey McCleary (born 1969), Indian-born New Zealand songwriter, composer, performer, producer and director
 Mikey Nicholls (born 1985), Australian professional wrestler
 Mikey North (born 1986), English actor
 Mikey Robins (born 1961), Australian media personality, game show host, comedian and writer
 Mikey Smith (1954-1983), Jamaican dub poet
 Mikey Way (born 1980), American musician, bassist of My Chemical Romance
 Mikey Walsh (born 1980), British writer, columnist and LGBT activist
 Mikey Welsh (1971-2011), American musician, former bassist of Weezer
 Mikey Wood (born 1996), rugby league player
 Mikey Dangerous, Jamaican/Canadian reggae artist
 Mikey Dread, Jamaican singer, producer, and broadcaster
 Mikey Spice, Jamaican reggae singer
 Cho Myung-ik (born 1980), member of the South Korean band Turbo
 Mikey or Mike Mondo, ring names of American professional wrestler Michael Brendli (born 1983)
 Mikey Whipwreck, ring name of American retired professional wrestler John Michael Watson (born 1973)
 Chancellor, formerly Mikey, American singer-songwriter and record producer born Kim Jung-seung (born 1986)

Fictional characters
 Little Mikey, in a commercial for Life cereal
Michelangelo (Teenage Mutant Ninja Turtles), nicknamed "Mikey"
 Mikey, a character in Little Secrets
 Mikey, main character in Pig City
 Mikey Blumberg, main character of Recess
 Mikey Fuccon, main character of The Fuccons
 Mikey Munroe, main character of Bunsen Is a Beast
 Mikey Palmice, a character in The Sopranos
 Mikey Simon, main character of Kappa Mikey
 Mikey Walsh, main character of The Goonies
 Mikey Waters, one of the two main characters of My Own Private Idaho
 Mikey Ubriacco, main character of Look Who's Talking

See also
 Myki, an Australian public transport ticketing system
 Mikeyy, a computer worm
 Mikie, a 1984 arcade game

English masculine given names
English-language masculine given names
Hypocorisms